The Nederlandsche Vereeniging voor Ambachts- en Nijverheidskunst (V.A.N.K.) (Dutch Association for Craft and Industrial Art) was founded in 1904. It was founded by Jacob Pieter van den Bosch, Herman Hana, Klaas van Leeuwen, Theo Molkenboer, and Willem Penaat. At the turn of the century the idea of artist-craftsmen was emerging. The existing Dutch societies and clubs for painters and architects did not adequately represent these artisans and they formed V.A.N.K., the first society for designers in the Netherlands.

V.A.N.K. aimed to elevate crafts and industrial design. Many founders were also interested in the changing focus of design to a new age of "truth, honesty, and realism" in the new century. Founder Willem Penaat focused on artistic ownership and copyright. Membership included artists interested in the socialist democratic movement, as well as artists who were mainly concerned with promoting their work though a trade union. V.A.N.K. organized exhibitions, published yearbooks and a trade journal. Their first exhibition was in 1911 at the Stedelijk Museum. The group went on to organize two shows at the Stedelijk Museum specifically on advertising art, the first in 1917 and again in 1935.

Members
Artists who were members of V.A.N.K. as listed in ARTindex Lexicon Online, unless otherwise noted.

Gallery
Selected work by members of VANK

References

External links

Dutch artists
Dutch artist groups and collectives
Arts organisations based in the Netherlands